The Side Deal is an American band from Newport Beach, California. The band was formed in 2017 by Grammy winning artist Charlie Colin of Train, Stan Frazier of Sugar Ray and brothers Joel and Scott Owen of The PawnShop kings.  Side Deal performed live with other notable artists such as Jeff “Skunk” Baxter of The Doobie Brothers, Steely Dan and Alice Cooper.

Singles

References

External links
 

Alternative rock groups from California
Grammy Award winners
People from Newport Beach, California